West Portsmouth may refer to:
 Portsmouth West (UK Parliament constituency)
 West Portsmouth, Ohio